USA Gold is an American brand of discount cigarettes, currently owned and manufactured by ITG Brands, a subsidiary of Imperial Tobacco. USA Gold brands were founded by Commonwealth Brands in 1991.

History
In 1991, Brad M. Kelley started Commonwealth Brands in Bowling Green, Kentucky. The goal was to undercut major cigarette companies by "producing discount 'branded generic' cigarettes". Kelley then sold Commonwealth Brands to Houchens Industries in 2001 for $1 billion, which at the time was the fifth-largest cigarette maker in the United States with a turnover of $800 million. USA Gold was the eighth best selling cigarette brand in the United States at the time.

In 2003, bargain brand cigarettes were selling cigarettes under names like "USA Gold and Roger". Deep-discount brands accounted for "10% of the U.S. market, up from 2% in 1997".

In 2007, British company Imperial Tobacco entered the United States discount cigarette market after purchasing the Commonwealth Brands for $1.9 billion. Through brands such as USA Gold and Sonoma, Commonwealth Brands controlled 3.7% of the U.S. cigarette market.

Products

Varieties sold in the United States
As of 2017, all varieties of USA Gold sold by ITG Brands are only available in a box.

 USA Gold Red (Full Flavor) KS-20-H - USA
 USA Gold (Lights) KS-20-H - USA
 USA Gold (Menthol Lights) KS-20-S - USA
 USA Gold (Non-Filter) KS-20-S - USA
 USA Gold (Ultra Lights) KS-20-S - USA

See also

 Tobacco smoking

References

External links

Imperial Brands brands
Products introduced in 1991